Kolesar (Slovak: Kolesár, feminine: Kolesárová) is a surname of Slovak, Serbian, or Croatian origin. Notable people with the surname include:

Mark Kolesar (born 1973), Canadian professional ice hockey player
Martin Kolesár (born 1997), Slovak footballer
Peter Kolesár (born 1998), Slovak footballer
Robert Kolesar (1921–2004), American football player and medical doctor
Anna Kolesárová (1928–1944), Slovak Roman Catholic martyr
Dagmar Kolesárová (born 1990), Slovak beauty pageant titleholder

References

See also
 

Serbian surnames
Croatian surnames
Slovak-language surnames